Moosonees Lake is a remote lake in north-eastern Saskatchewan, Canada about  north of the Fond du Lac River.

The surrounding area of Moosonees Lake is part of the subarctic climate zone. The vegetation around the lake consists of mainly sparse and often low-growth subarctic woods.

See also
List of lakes of Saskatchewan

References

Lakes of Saskatchewan